"Your Ghost" is the first track from American singer Kristin Hersh's debut solo studio album, Hips and Makers. It features additional backing vocals from Michael Stipe of R.E.M. Released as a single in January 1994, "Your Ghost" reached number one in Iceland, became a top-30 hit in Belgium and the Netherlands, and reached number 45 on the UK Singles Chart.

Description
The song was released as a single on January 10, 1994. It reached number 45 on the UK Singles Chart. It was voted in at number 41 on Australian radio station Triple J's Hottest 100 for 1994. According to Filmmaker magazine, the music video for the song was directed by Katherine Dieckmann and is an homage to Maya Deren's groundbreaking 1943 experimental film Meshes of the Afternoon.

Track listing
 CD single (BAD 4001 CD)
 "Your Ghost"
 "The Key"
 "Uncle June and Aunt Kiyoti"
 "When the Levee Breaks"

Charts

Weekly charts

Year-end charts

References

1994 debut singles
1994 songs
4AD singles
Number-one singles in Iceland
Sire Records singles